Kingdom of Kannur may refer to:

 Former feudal states in Malabar, India
Kolathunadu
Arakkal Kingdom